Siegfried Alfred Rudolf Friedrich von Kardorff (4 February 1873 in Berlin − 12 October 1945 in Berlin) was a German politician.

Life 
He was born the son of Wilhelm von Kardorff and followed him in adopting a career in politics. Describing himself as a "left-wing Free Conservative", Kardoff was from 1910 to 1918 member of Prussian House of Representatives. Kardorff helped found the German National People's Party. At one of its first public meetings in December 1918, Kardorff was the main speaker. He declared: "Our new party, in which friendly right-wing parties have united, has no past and rejects any responsibility for the past. We have a present and, if God will, a good future". Kardorff said that the party would uphold the monarchy, agriculture, the middle class and the church: "But we are not a party of Lutheran orthodoxy, rather we find recognition wherever living Christianity is found".

Kardorff later joined the German People's Party and was a member of its "industrial right-wing" according to the historian Stephen G. Fritz. From 1920 tot 1932 he was member of German Reichstag.

He also composed political biographies of Otto von Bismarck and his father; the latter was praised by G. P. Gooch, Carlton J. H. Hayes and Sidney B. Fay.

Notes

External links
 

1873 births
1945 deaths
Politicians from Berlin
German biographers
Members of the Reichstag of the Weimar Republic
Members of the Prussian House of Representatives
German National People's Party politicians
German People's Party politicians
Free Conservative Party politicians